Madame Aema 8 (애마부인 8 - Aema Buin 8) is a 1993 South Korean film directed by Suk Do-won. It was the eighth entry in the Madame Aema series, the longest-running film series in Korean cinema.

Plot
Following the multiple-Aema theme started in Madame Aema 6, this entry in the series has two women named Madame Aema. Both women are dancers, and are friends who differ in their thoughts on marriage. One believes in remaining single, and the other believes in marriage, and does so. After being disappointed with her husband's cheating and gambling, she leaves him. They are later reconciled after the husband repents of his behavior.

Cast
 Ru Mina: Madame Aema
 Kang Eun-ah: Madame Aema
 No Hyeon-u: Hyeon-woo
 Won Seok: Dong-hyeob
 Yoo Seong
 Seo Chang-sook
 Gil Dal-ho
 Cho Hak-ja
 Sue Young-suk

Bibliography

English

Korean

Contemporary reviews
 1993-04-03. "끝없이 춤추는 ‘애마부인’ 시리즈... 제8편 곧 극장개봉 (Endless Aema Buin series, upcoming release of the 8th episode). Hangeorae (한 겨 레) newspaper

Notes

Madame Aema
1993 films
1990s erotic films
1990s Korean-language films
South Korean sequel films